David Platt (also Tilsley) is a fictional character from the British ITV soap opera Coronation Street. He was born on-screen during the episode broadcast on 25 December 1990. He was played by Thomas Ormson from his first appearance until 15 March 2000 when Ormson left. Jack P. Shepherd took over the role and made his first on screen  appearance on 26 April 2000. In July 2019, Shepherd took a four-month break from the show.

Storylines
David is the son of Martin (Sean Wilson) and Gail Platt (Helen Worth). David was born on Christmas Day 1990. Martin's friend, Carmel Finnan (Catherine Cusack), tried to kidnap David when he was a toddler. She also posed as his mother to other characters. Carmel then tries to frame Gail for pushing her down the stairs and is revealed to be mentally ill. In 2000, a nine-year-old David becomes jealous of the attention his newborn niece Bethany Platt (Amy and Emily Walton) is getting. He decides to get attention by getting arrested for shoplifting. In 2001, Gail and Martin divorce after Martin has an affair with Rebecca Hopkins (Jill Halfpenny). David is unhappy and begins misbehaving in the hope that they will get back together. David becomes the target of a school bully and, despite Gail's advice to ignore him, he becomes violent and gets into fights. His behaviour worsens when Gail marries Richard Hillman (Brian Capron) in July 2002, but he comes to accept Richard. In March 2003, Richard is revealed to be a serial killer and tries to kill himself, Gail, David, Bethany and her mother - David's sister - Sarah Platt (Tina O'Brien) by driving them into the local canal. Gail, Sarah, David and Bethany are all rescued, while Richard drowns. In the years following, David develops a penchant for lying and scheming both at home and at school.

He is unhappy with Gail's relationship with Phil Nail (Clive Russell) and begins a hate campaign against Phil. David does not trust Phil, due to Richard's behaviour. Phil reaches a breaking point with David and throws him up against a wall, threatening to beat him up. David tells Gail, but Phil lies to her. Gail believes him and slaps David, unaware that he is telling the truth. Gail receives a card addressed from Richard. She suspects Phil of sending the cards. Realising David is behind the scam, Phil throws David across the table in front of Gail. An angry Gail ends their relationship. The Platt family continue to receive cards from Richard and Gail realises that David is the culprit. Gail blames herself for David's behaviour. In December 2006, David discovers Sarah's grandmother Ivy Tilsley's (Lynne Perrie) diary and reads it, and is shocked that Gail had wanted to abort him, but he understands this after Gail told him that Ivy had been having a rough time since the death of her son and Gail's then-husband, Brian Tilsley (Christopher Quinten). He develops romantic feelings for Maria Sutherland (Samia Longchambon), but is annoyed she is enjoying an affair with Charlie Stubbs (Bill Ward). Charlie threatens David into silence. David tries to blackmail Charlie, who tries drowning David in a bath to rid of him, but Maria walks in and saves him. In January 2007, Tracy Barlow (Kate Ford) murders Charlie, staging it to look like self-defence. David offers to testify for Tracy that he saw Charlie attack her on the condition that she sleeps with him. Tracy agrees, but the prosecution proves David's testimony to be lies.

In September 2007, David picks up some ecstasy tablets from his neighbour, Craig, who had kept them safe for one of his drug dealers. David hides the pills inside one of Bethany's dolls head, later David babysits for Sarah and Gail and leaves her alone to talk to Craig in the garden. Bethany finds the pills and takes one before playing with Gail's make up. David goes into check with her and finds the drugs laid on the floor. Shocked to see them, David yells at Bethany, asking if she took one of the pills, in which she denies, David then goes and find Craig to find out how many pills were in his bag, in which he replies with 10, but there's only 9, worried, David goes back to ask Bethany again, yelling at her again, she finally comes out that she took one.

In January 2008, David begins a relationship with Tina McIntyre (Michelle Keegan) and she becomes pregnant. In March 2008, Gail pays for an abortion and they decide not to tell David. He finds out and, in an argument, he pushes Gail down the stairs. He persuades Tina to give him an alibi, but she ends their romance. David smashes various vehicles and windows on the Street, attacks Ken Barlow (William Roache) and hits a policewoman. He is sentenced to four months in a Young Offenders Institution. When he is released, Tina reconciles with him but faces more issues when a jealous David reads her emails. He dates Amber Kalirai (Nikki Patel) in an attempt to make Tina jealous, which has the desired effect and they get back together.

In November 2008, David feuds with the Windass family when they refuse to pay for work that Tina's father Joe McIntyre (Reece Dinsdale) has carried out. David threatens Eddie (Steve Huison) and Anna Windass (Debbie Rush) with a crowbar. Len (Conor Ryan) and Gary Windass (Mikey North) steal Joe's work tools in retaliation. David then destroys their kitchen, so the Windass family remove the Platt's kitchen from their house. Gail and Anna are forced to call a truce to avoid more problems. David spends time away from Weatherfield when Tina wants nothing more to do with him. Upon his return, he becomes jealous of Tina and Gary's friendship. David frames Gary for theft and also tricks him into buying stolen goods. He then enlists Gary to commit robbery, which goes wrong when Gail's father Ted Page (Michael Byrne), interrupts them, calls the police and has a heart attack. Gary decides to confess to the police, which leads to David being arrested. David becomes jealous when Tina begins a relationship with Jason Grimshaw (Ryan Thomas). David discovers that Joe is addicted to prescription medication and agrees to supply him with drugs as long as he tries to break Tina and Jason up. In February 2010, Joe drowns in a boating accident while on his honeymoon in the Lake District, but the police presume that he has been murdered and arrest Gail. David has to scheme in order to prove Gail's innocence. In late 2010, Tina begins a relationship with Graeme Proctor (Craig Gazey). This upsets David and he feels betrayed. David suffers a black-out while driving and knocks Graeme over. No one believes David's versions of events and the police arrest him for attempted murder. Before the court case is about to begin, David passes out again and everyone begins to realise he was telling the truth. He is found to be suffering from epilepsy.

David returns from a holiday in Tenerife and announces his engagement to "Candy", aka Kylie Turner (Paula Lane). Gail is angry and tries to convince David to change his mind as she does not approve of Kylie. David and Kylie then get married in April 2011. David fights to take custody of Kylie's son Max Turner (Harry McDermott), but ends up feuding with her sister Becky McDonald (Katherine Kelly), with Kylie trying to avoid it. David insists that Steve and Becky are not fit to look after Max, proving this when he saves Max from being run over. David has to deal with Gail and Kylie feuding. When he learns that Gail has tried to bribe Kylie to leave, he threatens to leave home. Kylie gets a job at the salon with David. He is upset when Max is put up for adoption and she does not want to prevent it. He tells her that they must change their ways and convince social services to allow Max to live with them.

In August 2013, David discovers that Kylie has slept with Nick but does not confront them. He vandalises Nick's flat and writes poison pen letters to his wife Leanne. Nick tells David that he knows that he is behind the trouble and suggests they discuss it with Kylie. To prevent Kylie from finding out, David causes a car accident. Nick is left in a coma which results in permanent brain damage. To his relief, David learns that he is Lily's biological father, but when Kylie discovers that he is the reason behind Nick's injuries, she throws him out. Following their reconciliation, and a holiday to Barbados to visit Becky, Max's behaviour at home and at school gets worse and is diagnosed with ADHD in August 2014, and Kylie becomes addicted to his medication. In a quest to get to the source of Max's ADHD, she travels to her old haunt, a pub called The Dog & Gun in Wythenshawe, where she grew up. There, she encounters her ex-boyfriend and Max's biological father Callum. The pair continued to have secret meetings for weeks where Kylie gets hooked on amphetamine and Callum demands to see Max. David throws Kylie out after he finds out about her taking drugs and she leaves Weatherfield on Christmas Day 2014.

In January 2015, Max's father, Callum Logan, (Sean Ward) arrives and wants access to Max. When David refuses, Callum starts a custody battle, which begins a violent feud. Kylie returns in May 2015 and helps strengthen David's claim to Max. Their feud escalates and he manipulates Sarah and Bethany (now played by Lucy Fallon). When they try to frame Callum for a crime in September 2015, he attacks Sarah and Kylie kills Callum to protect her. David decides to help cover the murder up and buries the body down a manhole in their home. When a car crash occurs in May 2016, rescue workers find Callum's body buried beneath the concrete. David is initially the main suspect, but they frame the recently deceased Tony Stewart (Terence Maynard), Jason's father, another of Callum's enemies, who happens to be dead. In July 2016, Kylie decides she cannot live in the house Callum died in any longer. David agrees to relocate their family to Barbados with Kylie. Their plans are ruined when Clayton Hibbs (Callum Harrison) stabs Kylie in the street and she dies in David's arms. David then attacks Clayton who is then charged with Kylie's murder. Gail is concerned about David and his calm attitude towards planning Kylie's funeral.

In October 2016, David wants revenge for Kylie's murder, believing that there will be no justice for her. He publicly names Clayton, despite Clayton being fifteen years old, as Kylie's killer and attempts to kill Macca Hibbs, Clayton's step-brother, while he's in hospital. David plans his final act of revenge on Clayton by crashing his new car into the police van Clayton is in by igniting a large amount of petrol to blow them both up. After he makes a suicide video, Gail, Nick, and Sarah see it and lock David inside the cellar of the Bistro until the trial is finished. After tricking Gail into thinking that he has committed suicide, David escapes the Bistro, gets into his car that is doused in petrol and drives off. However, as he speeds along, David spots Lily on the road and swerves to avoid her, but ends up flipping the car, which lands on Lily and Gary (who had attempted to rescue Lily). Some of the residents are able to get Gary and Lily out as David manages to get out of the car. However, a spark causes the car to catch fire and explodes, setting Anna on fire leaving her badly injured, while David looks on in horror. Sarah admits to Gary, who she is in a relationship with, what David did, but she persuades him not to tell anyone for the sake of Max and Lily. David inherits £20,000 from a client who dies, as well as a dog named after him. Gary finds out from Sarah about the money, so David gives Anna and Kevin £19,000. In 2017, he begins a relationship with an older woman, Shona Ramsey (Julia Goulding), who he later discovers is Clayton's estranged mother. Despite this, they reconcile after working together to imprison Shona's ex-boyfriend Nathan Curtis (Christopher Harper) for sexually grooming Bethany. By November 2017, he went through a dramatic change in appearance and grew a beard.

In March 2018, David is drugged and raped by his new friend Josh Tucker (Ryan Clayton) after a night out. He is left ashamed and embarrassed by the ordeal. He then goes with Max and Lily to visit his dad Martin, at his home in Liverpool, who is preparing to emigrate to New Zealand. Martin, sensing something is wrong with David, travels back to Weatherfield to speak to him. Following the rape, David starts lashing out at everyone, worrying Shona, Gail, Martin, Sarah, Gary, Bethany and Audrey as well as many other residents. He takes Tyrone's place in the charity boxing event. His opponent is Gary. When they fight, David has flashbacks and he brutally attacks Gary while everyone watches in horror. This leaves Gary fighting for his life.  Sarah doesn't believe her own brother would do such a thing. But what nobody knows, except David himself, is he's still suffering mentally and emotionally from when Josh drugged and raped him.  This leads to him breaking up with Shona, saying he doesn't love her anymore. This leads to her moving out and moving in with Roy Cropper (David Neilson) at his flat above Roy's Rolls. He later starts a relationship with apprentice hairdresser Emma Brooker (Alexandra Mardell) who is only a year older than his niece Bethany. On the day of his trial for attacking Gary, he runs off while his solicitor Imran Habeeb (Charlie de Melo) is distracted. Shona finds him and he reveals his rape to her after finding out about Aidan Connor's (Shayne Ward) suicide. They get back together and Shona promises to stay by his side. David later tells Gail and Audrey about the rape while Gail tells Sarah. While doing community service for beating up Gary, he and another man make homophobic jibes towards gay vicar Billy Mayhew (Daniel Brocklebank). When Billy later asks him to apologise, David refuses and Billy locks the door. David breaks down and admits that he was raped. Billy later follows David when he follows Josh and a potential victim. Billy tells him to go home and do nothing. Billy later contradicts himself and warns the man of Josh. Josh gets beaten up by this man and ends up in hospital. He becomes blind and Billy regularly visits him out of guilt. Billy then lets Josh live with him as he has nowhere else to go. David and Shona find out and are disgusted with Billy. He is also furious when he finds out that Bethany knew about Billy visiting Josh in hospital. After Josh re-evaluates his behaviour, he visits David in the salon, however, he still will not admit to raping him. David kidnaps him and tricks him into thinking they are outside a police station. When Josh breaks down and pleads that his life would be hell in prison, David gets closure and tells Josh that they are in an alleyway, before leaving him stranded.

In 2019, Shona's now 18-year-old son Clayton faces the possibility of being transferred to an open prison in Liverpool as his safety is being jeopardised at Highfield Prison, with injuries as proof. David is unhappy, as there is a chance of him visiting Weatherfield on the weekends. Clayton's father, Dane, was trying to get his son transferred before his untimely death from a drug overdose. Shona decided to attend her ex-partner Dane's funeral, but lied to David of her whereabouts. Clayton was unhappy to see Shona there as he wished she had died instead of Dane. The funeral turned out to be a breakout plot devised by Clayton's stepbrother Macca, with thugs posing as undertakers cutting Clayton's handcuffs with bolt cutters and he runs away. Shona is arrested for helping him escape but denies having a role in his escape plot and she is released from custody shortly afterwards.

In July 2019, David is framed for stealing Audrey's money and is sentenced to four months in prison, while Nick, the person who really stole the money, is sentenced to 2 years imprisonment but receives a suspended sentence.

In October 2019, David is due to be released in a few weeks, in the lead up to his release he befriends a prisoner named Abe.  Shortly after he goes to take his medication in the medical wing, to the horror of David, he sees Josh. Abe tells David that a person named Tez is planning a prison riot where they will go and kill Josh.  David wants no involvement in this. During the riot, David stays in his cell but then Josh gets forced into the cell by Abe where he tells David to stab Josh. He refuses. The riot is seen by Shona, Sarah, and Max on the news. David and Josh leave the cell and Josh kicks Tez to slow them down, (who wants Josh dead). They make it into a room and barricade the door. David then says that he only saved Josh for him to suffer. Josh then starts taunting David, after that it isn't known if David stabbed Josh or not. David later manages to ring Shona via mobile phone to tell her what happened, she asks whether he stabbed Josh or not but doesn't answer. But is later visited in and tells Shona he didn't do it.

In January 2020, David arrived at Josh's court date after receiving a letter asking him to testify as Josh pleaded not guilty. David almost dropped it because Shona was his main priority, but David was convinced by Gail and went to testify. David was left worried after what Josh's solicitor said. Later, his solicitor Imran Habeeb visits David in the hospital, notifying him that Josh was found guilty of raping him and other people and that he received a sentence of 15 years. David was left shocked and relieved.

Creation

Casting

A character that viewers saw born in the soap, David's birth was part of the Coronation Street Christmas storyline in 1990, since David was days old and for most of his childhood, the character was played by Thomas Ormson. He was the only child of couple Martin and Gail Platt (Sean Wilson and Helen Worth), although Gail had two children from her first marriage. In 2000, Jack P. Shepherd took over the role. He made his first appearance on 26 April 2000.

Development
This was the first time that male rape had been a storyline in the programme's history, although such a theme had occurred on other soap operas. Ryan Clayton was cast as Josh in January 2018.

In January 2018, it was confirmed that Sean Wilson would be returning to Coronation Street after a thirteen-year absence as David's father Martin as part of the rape storyline.

Reception
David is arguably one of Coronation Street's best known characters of its modern era. The "Demon David" phase of his character in the late 2000s received considerable attention. His behaviour included sending greetings cards to his family supposedly from his murderous ex-stepfather Richard Hillman (Brian Capron), setting fire to his GCSE exam paper in front of dozens of his fellow students and driving himself into the canal (mirroring Hillman's attempt to murder his entire family in 2003) in an effort to ruin Sarah and Jason Grimshaw's wedding day. David's antics helped Shepherd to the Inside Soap Award for Best Bad Boy in 2007. The following year he also landed the British Soap Award for Villain of the Year.

In August 2017, Shepherd was longlisted for "Best Actor" and "Funniest Male" at the Inside Soap Awards. He did not progress to the viewer-voted shortlist. On 2 June 2018, Shepherd was awarded his first "Best Actor" accolade at The British Soap Awards 2018, following his performances during the rape storyline. In July 2018, Shepherd was longlisted for "Best Actor" and "Best Partnership", alongside Julia Goulding who plays Shona Ramsey, at the Inside Soap Awards. For his portrayal of David, Shepherd was nominated for Best Soap Actor (Male) at the 2018 Digital Spy Reader Awards; he came in third place with 9.5% of the total vote. David's male rape storyline was also nominated in the "Best Soap Storyline" category, while David and Shona's partnership was nominated in the "Best Soap Couple" category. Both nominations came in sixth place with 9.5% and 5.8% of their total votes respectively. In 2019, Shepherd received a National Television Awards nomination in the Serial Drama Performance category for his portrayal of David.

Fearing real-life imitation of the scene in which David was tortured by Charlie Stubbs, many formal complaints were filed by viewers with the Government's Office of Communications.  In the end, Coronation Street was cleared by TV watchdogs after 31 complaints about scenes of 'bullying and torture'".

Tony Stewart of the Daily Mirror  refers to the character as "David Pratt" when writing reviews of any storyline he features in, due to the character's way of seemingly always getting away with outlandish things. In magazine articles, he is often referred to as "Demon David", "Teen Tormenter", "Ratboy" or "Psycho Platt".

References

External links
David Platt at itv.com

Coronation Street characters
Fictional criminals in soap operas
Fictional hairdressers
Television characters introduced in 1990
Fictional attempted suicides
Fictional prisoners and detainees
Male villains
Fictional stalkers
Fictional victims of sexual assault
Child characters in television
Teenage characters in television
Male characters in television
Fictional characters with epilepsy and seizures